Mouloudia Club d'Oran (basketball) (Arabic: نادي مولودية وهران لكرة السلة), referred to as MC Oran BK for a short, is a basketball club based in Oran, Algeria that played in the Algerian Basketball Championship. The team was dissolved in 1994.

Honours
 Algerian Basketball Championship
Champion (1): 1983–84
 Algerian Basketball Cup
Winner (1): 1989–90
Runner-up (1): 1990–91

Notable players
  Abdelkader Soudani

References

External links
  Officiel website
  Fun website

Basketball
Basketball teams in Algeria
Sport in Oran
1994 disestablishments in Algeria
Basketball teams established in 1917
Basketball teams disestablished in 1994
1917 establishments in Africa